Limacina is a genus of swimming predatory sea snails commonly known as sea butterflies in the family Limacinidae. This genus contains some of the world's most abundant gastropod species.

Etymological meaning of the generic name Limacina is "snail-like".

As pelagic marine gastropods, Limacina swim by flapping their parapodia, inspiring the common name sea butterflies.

Sea butterflies are part of the clade Thecosomata. Sea angels, similar to Limacina, are in the order Gymnosomata. Both of these orders are still referred to as "pteropods". Sea butterflies of the order Thecosomata have a shell, while sea angels in the order Gymnosomata do not.

Shell description
The shells of Limacina are well developed, sinistrally coiled, turret-like, and include an operculum. Shell size and thickness vary within the genus. At high latitudes, the diameter of the shell does not exceed 15 mm. At lower latitudes, the diameter varies from 1 to 3 mm.

Description of the soft parts
Two large winglike parapodia, derived from foot tissue, propel these invertebrates through the water column to overcome negative buoyancy due to the animal's shell. As diel vertical migrators, Limacina inhabit deeper waters during the day and travel to the surface at night to feed.

Life habits
Feeding habits of Limacina are characterized by actively feeding on planktonic organisms such as bacteria, small crustaceans, gastropod larvae, dinoflagellates and diatoms. These prey items become entangled in a mucosal web (up to 5 cm wide) excreted by the animal that is, in turn, eaten along with the prey items. This net also provides positive buoyancy. Ciliated posterior footlobes and lateral footlobes move food collected by the mucosal web into the mouth.

Large aggregations of Limacina migrating to the surface of the water attract predators such as Clione (family Clionidae, suborder Gymnosomata), baleen whales, various species of salmonids, herring, and seabirds.

Species
Species within the genus Limacina include:
 † Limacina atypica (Laws, 1944) 
 (recent) Limacina bulimoides (d'Orbigny, 1836) - Bulimoid pteropod. Distribution: Red Sea, Pacific. Length: 1.2 mm.
 † Limacina erasmiana Janssen, 2010
  † Limacina dilatata (Koenen, 1892)
 † Limacina ferax (Laws, 1944) 
 † Limacina gormani (Curry, 1982)
 † Limacina guersi Janssen, 2010
 (recent) Limacina helicina (Phipps, 1774) - Helicid pteropod. Type species.
 (recent) Limacina lesueurii (d'Orbigny, 1836) - Distribution: North America, Western Atlantic.
 † Limacina limata (Marwick, 1926)
 † Limacina pygmaea (Lamarck, 1805)
 (recent)  Limacina rangii (d'Orbigny, 1834)
 (recent) Limacina retroversa (Fleming, 1823) - Retrovert pteropod. Distribution: North America, Western Atlantic, Arctic Ocean.
 † Limacina sculptilis (Maxwell, 1992) 
 † Limacina taylori (Curry, 1965)
 (recent) Limacina trochiformis (d'Orbigny, 1836) - Trochiform pteropod. Distribution: North America, Western Atlantic, Red Sea, Pacific. Length: 1 mm.
 † Limacina valvatina (Reuss, 1867)
 † Limacina? vegrandis Cahuzac & Janssen, 2010
Species brought into synonymy
 (recent) Limacina antarctica Woodward, 1854: synonym of Limacina rangii f. antarctica Woodward, 1854: synonym of Limacina rangii (d'Orbigny, 1834)
 Limacina balea Møller, 1841: synonym of Limacina retroversa (Fleming, 1823)
 Limacina contorta Sykes, 1905: synonym of Limacina trochiformis (d'Orbigny, 1834)
 Limacina crossei Pelseneer, 1888: synonym of Limacina lesueurii (d'Orbigny, 1835)
 Limacina cucullata Gould, 1852: synonym of Limacina rangii f. antarctica Woodward, 1854: synonym of Limacina rangii (d'Orbigny, 1834)
 Limacina helicialis Lamarck, 1819: synonym of Limacina helicina (Phipps, 1774)
 (recent) Limacina helicoides Jeffreys, 1877 - synonym of Thielea helicoides (Jeffreys, 1877)
 (recent) Limacina inflata (d'Orbigny, 1836) - Planorbid pteropod. Distribution: circumglobal, Red Sea, Pacific. Length: 1 mm. Description: the shell is flatly twisted, resembling the shell of the cephalopod Nautilus. - synonym: Heliconoides inflata (d’Orbigny, 1836)
 Limacina naticoides Souleyet, 1852: synonym of Limacina trochiformis (d'Orbigny, 1834)
 Limacina pacifica Dall, 1871: synonym of Limacina helicina pacifica Dall, 1871
 Limacina scaphoidea Gould, 1852: synonym of Heliconoides inflatus (d'Orbigny, 1834)

References

 Vaught, K.C. (1989). A classification of the living Mollusca. American Malacologists: Melbourne, FL (USA). . XII, 195 pp.
 Gofas, S.; Le Renard, J.; Bouchet, P. (2001). Mollusca, in: Costello, M.J. et al. (Ed.) (2001). European register of marine species: a check-list of the marine species in Europe and a bibliography of guides to their identification. Collection Patrimoines Naturels, 50: pp. 180–213

Limacinidae
Gastropod genera
Taxa named by Louis Augustin Guillaume Bosc